Waldemar Sorychta (born 1967) is a Polish heavy metal record producer and musician who has lived in Germany since 1982.

Career
He initially worked with German thrash metal band Despair, founded in 1986.

In 1994 he took part in the recording of the album Jesus Killing Machine by supergroup Voodoocult, led by German rock singer Phillip Boa featuring former Slayer drummer Dave Lombardo among others. Later on, Sorychta and Lombardo founded the band Grip Inc. He recorded four albums with Grip Inc.: Power of Inner Strength (1995), Nemesis (1997) Solidify (1999) and Incorporated (2004).

Sorychta is also well known as a record producer, working with such bands as Lacuna Coil, Sentenced, Tiamat, Samael, The Gathering, Tristania, Moonspell, and many others.  In 1995 he was nominated for a Grammi in Sweden as "Producer of the Year" for his recording of Wildhoney by Tiamat.

In 1999, he recorded the album Sleep of the Angels of the Greek metal band Rotting Christ as a session  musician.

Following the activity suspension of Grip Inc. in 2006, he founded the gothic metal band Eyes of Eden. He recorded with this band the album Faith, released on 17 August 2007. 
Also in 2006, he founded the thrash metal group Enemy of the Sun, which recorded the album Shadows, released on 7 December 2007.

In 2009, he worked with Floor Jansen and Joost van den Broek, former members of the Dutch band After Forever, on their then new project called ReVamp.

He is also a well-known guest player for several bands, e.g. Therion on their tour in 2010.

Discography

Enemy of the Sun 
 Shadows (2007) – guitar, producer
 Caedium (2010) – guitar, producer

Eyes of Eden 
Faith (2007) – guitar, producer

Despair 
History of Hate (1988) – guitar, vocals, producer
Decay of Humanity (1990) – guitar, producer
Beyond Reason (1992) – guitar, producer

Grip Inc. 

 Power of Inner Strength (1995) – guitar, backing vocals, producer
 Nemesis (1997) – guitar, keyboards, producer
 Solidify (1999) – guitar, keyboards, producer
 Incorporated (2004) – guitar, backing vocals, producer

Rotting Christ 
 Sleep of the Angels (1999) – guitar (session)

Voodoocult 
 Jesus Killing Machine (1994) – guitar, producer

As producer

 Tiamat –   The Astral Sleep (1991)  – also guitar
 Unleashed –   Where No Life Dwells (1991)
 Samael –  Blood Ritual (1992)
 Unleashed –  Shadows in the Deep (1992)
 Tiamat –  Clouds (1992)
 Samael –  Ceremony of Opposites (1994)
 Tiamat – Wildhoney (1994) – also keyboards
 Moonspell –  Wolfheart (1995)
 Alastis –  ...And Death Smiled (1995)
 Samael –  Rebellion (EP) (1995)
 The Gathering – Mandylion (1995)
 Moonspell –  Irreligious (1996)
 Samael –  Passage (1996)
 Sentenced – Down  (1996) – also keyboards
 Alastis –  The Other Side (1997) – also keyboards
 Samael –  Exodus (1998)
 Moonspell –  Sin/Pecado (1998)
 Lacuna Coil – Lacuna Coil (EP) (1998)
 Alastis –  Revenge (1998)
 Sentenced –   Frozen (1998) – also keyboards
 Therion – Vovin  (1998) – also guitar
 Therion –  Crowning of Atlantis (1999) – also guitar
 Lacuna Coil – In a Reverie (1999) – also keyboards
 Dismal Euphony –  All Little Devils (1999) – also guitar, keyboards
 Therion –  Deggial (2000) – also acoustic guitar
 Lacuna Coil –  Halflife (2000)
 Flowing Tears –  Jade (2000)
 Lacuna Coil – Unleashed Memories (2001)
 Lacuna Coil –  Comalies (2002)
 Flowing Tears –  Serpentine (2002)
 Flowing Tears – Razorbliss (2005)
 Samael –  Reign of Light (2005)
 Lacuna Coil – Karmacode (2006)
 Moonspell –  Memorial (2006) also bass guitar
 Tristania – Illumination (2006–2007)
 Samael –  Solar Soul (2007)
 Rusty Eye –  Possessor (2009) also guest guitar, keyboards and mixing.
 Witchbreed – Heretic Rapture (2009)
 The Very End – Mercy & Misery (2010)
 Sodom – In War and Pieces (2010)
 The Other – New Blood (2010)
 Samael –  Lux Mundi (2010)
 Exumer – Fire & Damnation (2012)
 The Very End – Turn Off the World (2012)
 Sodom – Epitome of Torture (2013)
 Charm Designer – Everlasting (2016)
 Samael –  Hegemony (2017)

Compilations

 Metalmeister Vol. 2 (1997)
 21st Century Media Blitz Vol. 2 (1999)
 Beauty in Darkness Vol. 3 (1999)
 Metal Dreams (1999)
 Metal Dreams Vol. 3 (2001)
 Metal Blade Records 20th Anniversary (2002)
 Anthems for the Rotten Vol. 1 (2003)
 MTV2 Headbangers Ball (2003)
 Resident Evil: Apocalypse Original Soundtrack (2004)
 Alone in the Dark Original Soundtrack (2005)

References

External links
 
 
 

1968 births
German record producers
German heavy metal guitarists
German male guitarists
German keyboardists
Therion (band) members
Eyes of Eden members
Living people
Musicians from Zabrze
Voodoocult members
ReVamp members
Grip Inc. members